The 2016 United States House of Representatives elections in New Mexico were held on November 8, 2016, to elect the three U.S. representatives from the state of New Mexico, one from each of the state's three congressional districts. The elections coincided with the 2016 U.S. presidential election, as well as other elections to the House of Representatives, elections to the United States Senate and various state and local elections. The primaries were held on June 7. All three incumbent representatives were re-elected in the general election.

District 1

Democrat Michelle Luján Grisham, first elected in 2012, is the incumbent in the 1st district. The district has a PVI of D+7.

Republican primary

Primary results

Democratic primary

Primary results

General election

District 2

Republican Steve Pearce, first elected in 2010, is the incumbent in the 2nd district. The district has a PVI of R+5.

Republican primary

Primary results

Democratic primary

Primary results

General election

District 3

Democrat Ben Ray Luján, first elected in 2008, is the incumbent in the 3rd district. The district has a PVI of D+8.

Republican primary

Primary results

Democratic primary

Primary results

General election

References

External links
U.S. House elections in New Mexico, 2016 at Ballotpedia
Campaign contributions at OpenSecrets

New Mexico
2016
United States House